John Regan may refer to:

 John Regan (bassist)
 John Keating Regan (1911-1987),  U.S. federal judge
 John Regan (footballer) (b. 1944)
 John Regan (rapper), American rapper

See also
 Jonny Regan, TV personality
 Jack Regan (disambiguation)
 John Reagan (disambiguation)
 General John Regan (disambiguation)